Figline may refer to the following Italian places or teams:

Figline Valdarno, a municipality in the province of Florence, Tuscany
A.S.D. Giallo-Blu Figline: Italian team of football based in Figline Valdarno
Figline Vegliaturo, a municipality in the province of Cosenza, Calabria
Figline di Prato, a frazione of Prato, Tuscany
Figline, the ancient name of Forlì, used in the 11th and 12th century